Sakina Jaffrey (born February 14, 1962) is an American actress.

Early life
Jaffrey was born in New York City, the youngest daughter of Indian-born parents, actress and food and travel writer Madhur Jaffrey, and actor Saeed Jaffrey. Her parents divorced when she was three years old, and she grew up estranged from her father, who subsequently moved to the United Kingdom.

She grew up in the Greenwich Village section of Manhattan where she attended PS 41. Later she attended the Nightingale-Bamford School in the Upper East Side.

Jaffrey picked up her love of Chinese culture from her elder sister, Meera. She graduated from Vassar College in 1984, with a major in Chinese Language and Literature at the college, originally planning to be a translator before she became an actress.

Career
At the age of 17, Jaffrey made her professional acting debut in the play Marie and Bruce by Wallace Shawn at the Public Theatre in New York City.

She appeared with her father in the film Masala (1991) and with her mother in The Perfect Murder (1988). In 2002, she appeared in The Truth About Charlie starring Mark Wahlberg. Her children Cassius and Jamila appear with her in Raising Helen (2004) and in The Ode (2008).

She starred as Linda Vasquez, the White House Chief of Staff, in the Netflix series House of Cards (2013). In 2014, it was announced that she would be appearing in the second season of Fox's television series Sleepy Hollow as Leena Reyes, the new sheriff.

From 2016 to 2018, she had a starring role in the NBC television series Timeless as Homeland Security Agent Denise Christopher.

She also starred as Malini Soni in The Meyerowitz Stories, a 2017 comedy-drama film directed by Noah Baumbach and costarring Dustin Hoffman and Adam Sandler.

Personal life
Jaffrey lives in suburban New York City with her husband, Francis Wilkinson, a journalist, and their two children, Cassius and Jamila.

Acting credits

Film

Television

Theatre

Awards and nominations

References

External links

American film actresses
American television actresses
American actresses of Indian descent
Living people
Actresses from New York City
Vassar College alumni
People from Manhattan
21st-century American actresses
20th-century American actresses
American people of Punjabi descent
People from Nyack, New York
1962 births